Bermane Stiverne (born November 1, 1978) is a Haitian-Canadian professional boxer. He held the WBC heavyweight title from 2014 to 2015. He also challenged twice for world titles in 2017 and 2021.

Amateur career
Stiverne started boxing at the age of 19. As an amateur he won a silver medal in the super heavyweight division at the 2005 National Championships, as well as bronze in the 2003 and 2004 Championships. In international competition he beat Robert Helenius (points) and David Price (knockout). His total amateur record was 49 wins and 10 losses. Stiverne commented about his absence from the Olympics: "In a qualifying tournament in Mexico I met a Mexican fighter in the semi-finals and I was robbed. I knocked him down three times but still they gave him the decision and the place in Olympics." That fighter was Mexican-American George Garcia.

Professional career

Early career
Stiverne turned professional under promoter Don King, and knocked out his first twelve opponents with his favoured left hook.

In 2007 he lost by TKO to Demetrice King. In January 2011, he fought and KOd Kertson Manswell in the 2 round. He won the vacant WBC International, vacant WBC USNBC and vacant WBA Fedelatin heavyweight titles. He fought Ray Austin on June 25, 2011 for the vacant WBC Silver heavyweight title. Stiverne won the fight by a 10-round TKO, becoming the mandatory challenger for the WBC heavyweight championship, then held by Vitali Klitschko.

WBC Heavyweight champion

Stiverne vs. Arreola II
On December 19, 2013, the WBC ordered their #1 ranked heavyweight Bermane Stiverne, and their #2 ranked heavyweight Chris Arreola to fight for the world heavyweight championship, which was vacated by Vitali Klitschko in October. The fight was an immediate rematch of their April 27, 2013 bout, which Stiverne won by unanimous decision. The title fight was scheduled for May 10, 2014, and was held at the Galen Center in Los Angeles, California. Despite beating Arreola in their previous meeting, Stiverne entered the bout as a +140 underdog, with a number of media outlets predicting an Arreola win. Stiverne won the rematch by a sixth-round technical knockout. Arreola was caught with a right hand early on in the round, and was unable to defend against the increasing volume of Stiverne, which prompted the referee to wave the fight off. Stiverne became the first Haitian-born boxer to win a world heavyweight championship. He was congratulated by notable Haitians on this accomplishment, including by the  President of Haiti, Michel Martelly

Stiverne vs. Wilder
Stiverne made his first WBC heavyweight title defense against the 2008 Olympic Games bronze medalist Deontay Wilder. The fight was scheduled for January 17, 2015, and was held at the Barclays Center in New York City, New York. Stiverne lost the fight by unanimous decision, with scores of 120-107, 119-108 and 118-109. Stiverne landed just 110 punches over the course of the twelve rounds, while Wilder landed 227 punches. Stiverne was hospitalized with dehydration following his title loss, but was released a few days later.

Post title reign

The cancelled Povetkin vs. Stiverne fight
In 2016, the WBC ordered mandatory challenger Alexander Povetkin to fight Stiverne for the interim WBC heavyweight title. On November 11, the WBC were informed that Stiverne had tested positive for the banned substance methylhexaneamine. Stiverne claimed he ingested a supplement without knowing that it contained the banned substance. The WBC took into account that it was Stiverne's first offence when making its ruling and fined him $75,000. Just 20 hours before the fight was to take place, the WBC withdrew its sanction of the fight stating Povetkin had failed a drug test for ostarine. Stiverne declined to fight Povetkin.

Stiverne vs. Wilder II
On November 4, 2017, Stiverne again fought Wilder for the WBC world heavyweight title. Before the fight he had remained largely inactive with only two bouts in nearly three years. At the time of the fight he was the only man to go twelve rounds with Wilder. The rematch proved to be disappointing as he was knocked unconscious in the first round. Stats showed that he only threw four punches during the entire fight, none of which connected.

Stiverne vs. Joyce
In 2019, Stiverne faced undefeated British heavyweight contender Joe Joyce (7-0, 7 KOs) on the undercard of Chris Eubank Jr. vs. James DeGale on February 23. Joyce was ranked #5 by the WBA at heavyweight. Joyce opened up by throwing power shots and pressing the opponent. Outshaped 40-years-old Stiverne had some successful counterattacks but stayed passive most of the time. The fight was stopped by the referee in the 6th round, Stiverne losing by TKO.

Stiverne vs. Bryan
On January 29, 2021, Stiverne faced WBA regular heavyweight champion and #1 WBA ranked heavyweight Trevor Bryan. Bryan managed to drop Stiverne twice, with the referee stopping the fight shortly after the second knockdown, at the middle of round eleven.

Personal life
Stiverne was born in Plaine-du-Nord, Haiti. He is the youngest of 14 children, having eight sisters and five brothers. In July 2011, he volunteered at the Welcome Hall Mission in Montreal, to offer training and inspiration to local homeless youth. Stiverne is known to be a fan of the Miami Heat.

Professional boxing record

References

External links

Bermane Stiverne - Profile, News Archive & Current Rankings at Box.Live

1978 births
Living people
Sportspeople from Quebec
Haitian emigrants to Canada
Haitian Quebecers
Canadian male boxers
World heavyweight boxing champions
World Boxing Council champions
Super-heavyweight boxers
Doping cases in boxing
Canadian sportspeople in doping cases
Black Canadian boxers